The Curtiss XP-22 Hawk was a 1930s American experimental biplane fighter built by Curtiss for evaluation by the United States Army Air Service.

Design and development
In 1929, the AAC ordered three P-11 Hawks for testing of the 600 hp (447 kW) H-1640 Chieftain engine. This engine proved a failure, and before completion, one of the three was converted to use a 9-cylinder 575 hp (429 kW) Cyclone, being completed as the YP-20. Testing with the R-1820 was prolonged, so the Army acquired another of the three P-11s, instead. This became the XP-22.

A number of changes were made for installing the 700 hp (520 kW) Curtiss V-1570 Conqueror engine. The radiator was relocated, a new cowl was fitted, and the tail was given more fin and less rudder area, and featured a steerable tailwheel, rather than the original skid. For these changes, Curtiss charged only US$1.

During testing, the XP-22 underwent a number of alterations and improvements, including a change from a three-strut landing gear to a single streamlined strut, later fitted with wheel pants. Fillets were added where struts joined the wing and the tail was briefly reduced in area, to P-6 standard. The XP-22 was also the Army's first fighter capable of 200 mph (320 km/h), achieving 202 mph (325 km/h).

Operational history
In June 1931, the AAC held a competition to evaluate the P-6, P-12, YP-20, and XP-22. The XP-22 came out the winner, earning a contract for 45 aircraft as the Y1P-22. Following the trials, the XP-22 donated a nose and landing gear graft to the YP-20, which became the XP-6E, and the 45 production aircraft were completed to this standard.

Operators

United States Army Air Forces

Specifications (XP-22 Hawk)

References

Further reading
 Donald, David, ed. Encyclopedia of World Aircraft. Etobicoke, Ontario, Canada: Prospero Books, 1997. .
 Fitzsimons, Bernard, ed. "Hawk, Curtiss Models 34 and 35 P-1 to P-6 and F6C". Illustrated Encyclopedia of Weapons and Warfare. Volume 12, pp. 1255–1256, London: Phoebus Publishing, 1978.
 Jones, Lloyd S. U.S. Fighters: 1925-1980s. Fallbrook, California: Aero Publishers, Inc., 1975. .

Curtiss P-22
P-22 Hawk
Single-engined tractor aircraft
Biplanes